Humba Dreams is a 2019 Indonesian drama film written and directed by Riri Riza. It stars JS Khairen and Ully Triani. The film had its world premiere at the 2019 Shanghai International Film Festival.

At the 40th Citra Awards, the film received six nominations and won one.

Premise
Martin, a young and restless film student in Jakarta, is called back home to his village in Sumba Island. Apparently, his late father left him an exposed roll of celluloid film. While finding ways to develop the footage, he embarks on a journey of self-discovery.

Cast
JS Khairen as Martin
Ully Triani as Ana
Ephy Pae as Jean Luc

Production
The production of Humba Dreams was initiated by Riza and producer Mira Lesmana after discovering a photographic film studio during the filming of The Golden Cane Warrior in Sumba Island.

In 2017, the film received the CJ Entertainment Award at the Asian Project Market and was awarded $10,000 as the prize. Humba Dreams was also selected as one of the eight film projects, promoted by the Creative Economy Agency (Bekraf) in Cannes, helped out to receive production and distribution deals.

Release
Humba Dreams had its world premiere at the 2019 Shanghai International Film Festival. The film is distributed in Indonesia through Netflix on 9 July 2020.

Accolades

References

Indonesian drama films
Films about film directors and producers
Films about filmmaking
Self-reflexive films
2019 drama films
Films directed by Riri Riza
2010s Indonesian-language films